Aiken State Park is a state park located near the town of Windsor in Aiken County, South Carolina.

History
Aiken State Park was one of the 16 original parks in South Carolina, built by an African American detachment of the Civilian Conservation Corps. Many of the original buildings are still in use.

Activities and amenities
Activities available at the park include picnicking, fishing, bird watching, boating, swimming, geocaching, biking and camping. There are a few nature trails in the park as well.

Amenities include a playground, picnic shelters, horseshoe pits, a boat ramp on the Edisto River, a 1.7 mile canoe trail and a park store.

Visitors can rent fishing rods and reels, non-motorized fishing boats and canoes from the park office.

References

External links

State parks of South Carolina
Civilian Conservation Corps in South Carolina
Protected areas of Aiken County, South Carolina
1934 establishments in South Carolina
Protected areas established in 1934